Michael White (born 5 July 1991) is a Welsh professional snooker player from Neath, Glamorgan. Nicknamed ‘Lightning’ due to his fast playing style, White is a former top 16 player and two-time ranking event winner.

A highly rated junior,  he became the youngest player to have made a century break in competitive play aged 9, and won the World Amateur Championship at 14. White won his first ranking event at the 2015 Indian Open, before breaking into the top 16 during the 2015-16 season and capturing his second ranking title at the 2017 Paul Hunter Classic.

White's form started to decline in the 2018-19 season however, eventually leading to him dropping off the professional tour in 2020. He regained his tour card in 2022 by qualifying for the 2022 Snooker World Championship, becoming only the second amateur ever to qualify for the tournament in the process.

Career

Early career
White first showed potential by becoming the youngest player to make a century break: a 105 in March 2001, when aged nine. In 2001, he was invited to the Crucible, where John Parrott commented: 'I hope I've retired before I have to play him!'
He won a number of junior and later amateur events, and in 2006 became the youngest ever winner of the IBSF World Grand Prix, winning it aged 14. He also won the European under-19 Championship, beating Vincent Muldoon in the final. 
He turned professional for the 2007–08 season, but he was not allowed to play in the first ranking event of the season, the 2007 Shanghai Masters as it fell short of his 16th birthday which allowed his opponent Lee Walker a walkover. Previously Shaun Murphy had been allowed to play aged 15.

Turning professional
In his first professional match, the Masters qualifying, he shocked Leicester player Tom Ford 4–0, however he lost to eventual champion Barry Hawkins 5–2 in the following round.
His first season on the Main Tour was relatively unsuccessful, winning only four matches in the seven ranking events.
In his first ranking tournament, the Grand Prix, he finished last in his group, beating Tony Drago but losing his other 6 matches. His most successful run was beating Shailesh Jogia 10–4 in the first round of the World Championship qualifiers, but he lost 10–4 to Barry Pinches in the next. These results meant that he dropped off the Main Tour.

He regained a place on the Main Tour for the 2009–10 Season by finishing top of the Welsh rankings.

In the qualifiers for the 2009 Shanghai Masters he beat former world champion John Parrott 5–0 (who later joked "I hope I retire before I have to play him...again" in reference to his earlier comment) before losing 5–3 to Mark Davis. His best run during the season was to the last 48 of the UK Championship, with victories over Daniel Wells, Jin Long and Jamie Burnett before losing 9–4 to Liang Wenbo. This meant that by the end of the season he had done enough to retain his tour status.

2010/2011 season
He started the new season by winning three qualifying matches in the 2010 Shanghai Masters, including a 5–1 win over Dominic Dale, before losing to Peter Ebdon by the same scoreline. He won two matches, before losing in the third qualifying round on two further occasions during the season. At the minor-ranking Euro PTC Event 3 White beat the likes of Tom Ford and Marco Fu to reach the quarter-finals, where he lost 2–4 to Andrew Higginson. He went on to finish 51st on the PTC Order of Merit and 71st in the world rankings.

2011/2012 season
White narrowly missed out on a place in the 2012 Players Tour Championship Finals as he finished 25th on the Order of Merit, with only 24 players qualifying for the event. His placing was largely thanks to a semi-final run in Event 7, where his hopes of a first professional title were ended by Ronnie O'Sullivan, who won 4–2. Even though he could not qualify for a ranking event throughout the season he ended it at a then career high world ranking of 54, meaning he had risen 12 places during the year.

2012/2013 season
White began the 2012–13 season by winning three matches to qualify for the Wuxi Classic and two matches to qualify for the International Championship but lost in the wildcard once at the venues in China in both, to Zhou Yuelong 4–5 and Lü Haotian 5–6 respectively. White beat Craig Steadman and Ken Doherty to qualify for the UK Championship, the first time he had made it into the first round of a ranking event. In his first domestic televised match in a ranking event, White played world number two Mark Selby and recovered from 0–2 down to level at 3–3 before succumbing to a 3–6 defeat, with White stating afterwards that he would definitely be back for more. He kept true to his word by beating Zhang Anda 10–5 and Andrew Higginson 10–4 (he trailed 1–3 but won nine of the next ten frames) to qualify for the first round of the biggest tournament in snooker, the World Championship. He beat compatriot and two-time winner of the event Mark Williams in the opening round 10–6, with Williams admitting he had been outplayed in every department of the game. He beat fellow qualifier Dechawat Poomjaeng 13–3 in the last 16 and faced Ricky Walden in his first ranking event quarter-final, losing 6–13. White increased his ranking to world number 34, a climb of 20 spots during the season which was the most of any player on tour.

2013/2014 season
White had an extremely consistent 2013–14 season as he played in the first round of 10 of the 12 ranking events. 
In the inaugural Indian Open he beat Zhang Anda and Gary Wilson to reach his second career quarter-final. He lost the last three frames against Stephen Maguire to be defeated 4–3. White reached the second round in four more ranking events during the rest of the season but was beaten on each occasion. At the World Championship, White was a qualifier and faced world number three (and eventual champion) Mark Selby in the first round. White recovered from 5–1, 8–4, and 9–8 behind to take the match to a deciding 19th frame, which he lost. He finished inside the top 32 in the rankings for the first time in his career as the world number 27.

2014/2015 season

In the first round of the Shanghai Masters, White came from 3–0 down against Neil Robertson to win 5–4 and went on to defeat Ryan Day 5–2 to make the quarter-finals. White made another comeback to force a deciding frame this time from 4–1 behind, but Mark Allen won it. Another quarter-final followed at the International Championship where Allen was again the victor as he won 6–3, after White had been 3–1 up.

In March 2015, White had a phenomenal run of form. He won his first professional title at the Shoot-Out, the tournament where each match is decided by one 10-minute frame, White won the title by taking the lead in the final against Xiao Guodong with six seconds remaining. He then won the Indian Open after reaching the semi-finals of a ranking event for the first time in his fifth attempt by beating Chris Wakelin 4–2. White then defeated Mark Williams 4–2 and saved his best performance of the week for the final against Ricky Walden where he scored a total of 419 points to Walden's 27 in claiming his first ranking title with a 5–0 win. His prize money for winning back-to-back tournaments stood at £82,000. White made his debut in the PTC Grand Final and lost 4–3 to Martin Gould in the first round. A pair of deciding frame victories over Ken Doherty and Stuart Bingham helped him to the last 16 of the China Open, but he was eliminated 5–1 by Robert Milkins. White's season ended with a 10–5 defeat to Craig Steadman in the second round of the World Championship qualifying. His year was reflected in the rankings as he rose 10 places to end it 17th in the world.

2015/2016 season
White reached the quarter-finals of the Australian Goldfields Open, the first ranking event of the season and played former schoolmate Jamie Jones. The match went to a decider after White had been 4–2 up and he made a 56 in it, before Jones cleared with 66 to win 5–4. His ranking title gave him entry into the Champion of Champions, where he lost 4–2 to Joe Perry in the first round and he suffered an opening round 6–5 loss to Sydney Wilson, a player ranked more than 100 places lower than White, at the UK Championship. However, at the Gibraltar Open he whitewashed reigning world champion Stuart Bingham to reach his first European Tour final, but was defeated 4–1 by Marco Fu. White played in his first Welsh Open quarter-final after knocking out John Higgins 4–1 and lost it 5–0 to Mark Allen.
After White lost 10–7 to Sam Baird in the first round of the World Championship he revealed that he suffers from depression and the stress of playing professional snooker can exacerbate it.

2016/2017 season
White lost 4–2 in the fourth round of the Paul Hunter Classic to Jimmy White. A 5–4 re-spotted black win over Jimmy Robertson qualified him for the Shanghai Masters and he beat Ricky Walden 5–4 and Judd Trump 5–3, before losing 5–1 to Stephen Maguire in the quarter-finals. A second quarter-final came at the Northern Ireland Open and White was ousted 5–2 by Barry Hawkins. White lost 6–4 to compatriot Matthew Stevens in the second round of the UK Championship. He recorded a 4–3 win over John Higgins at the World Grand Prix, before being defeated 4–2 by Ryan Day in the second round. White hit three centuries in his 5–3 first round win over Yu Delu at the China Open and then beat Ali Carter by the same scoreline, but lost 5–1 to Shaun Murphy in the third round. He was heavily defeated 10–3 by Gary Wilson in the final qualifying round for the World Championship.

2017/2018 season
White picked up his second ranking title by defeating Shaun Murphy 4–2 in the final of the 2017 Paul Hunter Classic, having previously defeated defending champion Mark Selby 4–1 in the fourth round.

2018/2019 season

2019/2020 season

A "sudden loss of form" this season saw no finals and only one finish better than a second-round loss, that being the UK Championship, where he defeated Mark Selby 4–1 in the fourth round before losing by the same scoreline to Ian Burns in the quarter final. White thus dropped off the pro tour in 2020, which he later credited to personal issues including depression and "a bit of a problem with alcohol".

2020/2021 season

2021/2022 season
White came from 6–7 behind to defeat Jordan Brown 10–8 in the fourth qualifying round of the 2022 World Snooker Championship, becoming only the second amateur to qualify for the Crucible after James Cahill in 2019. However, he went on to lose 10–3 in the first round to three-time champion Mark Williams, who made four centuries in the match. White will nevertheless regain his tour card for the subsequent season.

Performance and rankings timeline

Career finals

Ranking finals: 2 (2 titles)

Minor-ranking finals: 1

Non-ranking finals: 1 (1 title)

Pro-am finals: 2 (2 titles)

Amateur finals: 6 (3 titles)

References

External links

 
Michael White at worldsnooker.com
 Profile on Global Snooker
 Whitez Snooker & Pool

Living people
Welsh snooker players
1991 births
Snooker players from Neath